4142 Dersu-Uzala, provisional designation , is a Hungaria asteroid, sizable Mars-crosser and potentially slow rotator from the innermost region of the asteroid belt, approximately  in diameter. It was discovered by Czech astronomer Zdeňka Vávrová at Kleť Observatory on 28 May 1981. The rare A-type asteroid has a rotation period of 140 hours. It was named after the Siberian trapper and hunter Dersu Uzala.

Orbit and characterization 

Dersu-Uzala is a member of the dynamical Hungaria group of asteroids, which form the innermost dense concentration of asteroids in the Solar System. It orbits the Sun in the inner asteroid belt at a distance of 1.6–2.2 AU once every 2 years and 8 months (965 days; semi-major axis of 1.91 AU). Its orbit has an eccentricity of 0.15 and an inclination of 26° with respect to the ecliptic. As its orbit crosses that of Mars at 1.66 AU, it is also a Mars crossing asteroid.

Naming 

This minor planet was named after Dersu Uzala, a Siberian trapper and hunter and friend of Russian writer Vladimir Arsenyev, who named the main character of his novel Dersu Uzala after him. The approved naming citation was published by the Minor Planet Center on 6 February 1993.

Physical characteristics 

In the SMASS classification, Dersu-Uzala is an A-type asteroid. It has also been characterized as an Srw-type, a subtype of the stony S-type asteroids.

Rotation period 

In December 2006, a rotational lightcurve of Dersu-Uzala was obtained from photometric observations by American photometrist Brian Warner at the Palmer Divide Observatory in Colorado. Lightcurve analysis gave a rotation period of  hours with a brightness amplitude of 0.60 magnitude. Alternative observations gave a period of 71 and 71.2 hours, respectively.

Diameter and albedo 

According to the surveys carried out by the Japanese Akari satellite and NASA's Wide-field Infrared Survey Explorer with its subsequent NEOWISE mission, Dersu-Uzala measures 6.01 and 6.34 kilometers in diameter and its surface has an albedo of 0.164 and 0.30, respectively. The Collaborative Asteroid Lightcurve Link assumes a standard albedo for a stony asteroid of 0.2 and calculates a diameter of 7.13 kilometers based on an absolute magnitude of 13.1.

Notes

References

External links 
 Asteroid Lightcurve Database (LCDB), query form (info )
 Dictionary of Minor Planet Names, Google books
 Asteroids and comets rotation curves, CdR – Observatoire de Genève, Raoul Behrend
 Discovery Circumstances: Numbered Minor Planets (1)-(5000) – Minor Planet Center
 
 

004142
004142
Discoveries by Zdeňka Vávrová
Named minor planets
004142
004142
19810528